The French Army Signals Band is a French Army military band based out of Rennes. It consists of 53 musicians, who make up one of the seven bands of the army (excluding the bands of the regiments and military schools). It is led by Captain Sandra Ansanay-Alex, who has served in this capacity since 2013. She is the first female conductor in the history of the French Army. It employs the Brittany region's Celtic heritage with its 2 bagpipes and a bombard player in its ranks. It has participated in international events such as the Sevastopol Military Tattoo, the Spasskaya Tower Military Music Festival and Tattoo and the Virginia International Tattoo. €67,340.96 was the sum of money that was collected during the concerts the band provided in 2019.

It was originally the Band of the 41st Infantry Regiment. It would later become the North-West Army Region and in 2010, was renamed to the Artillery Band. When it was the Artillery Band, it was part of the 16th Artillery Group. With the army reforms that became effective on 1 September 2016, it was renamed to the Signals Band.

See also
 191st Army Band
 Royal Artillery Band
 Royal Canadian Artillery Band
 French Republican Guard Band

References

French military bands